Ilyinka is a rural locality (a selo) in Pribaykalsky District, Republic of Buryatia, Russia. The population was 4,203 as of 2010. There are 52 streets.

Geography 
Ilyinka is located 29 km southwest of Turuntayevo (the district's administrative centre) by road. Troitskoye is the nearest rural locality.

References 

Rural localities in Okinsky District